Huánuco is a city in central Peru. It had a population of 196,627 as of 2017 and in 2015 it had a population of 175,068. It is the capital of the Huánuco Region and the Huánuco District. It is the seat of the diocese of Huánuco. The metropolitan city of Huanuco is 170,000 hab (2011, urban pop, INEI). It has three districts, Huanuco (head), Amarilis, and Pillco Marca. In this city, the Higueras river meets the Huallaga river, one of the largest rivers in the country.

History 

The city of Huánuco was founded by Spanish conquistador Gómez de Alvarado in 1539, in the Inca town of Yarowilca. In 1541, the city was moved to its current location in the Pillco Valley.

Geography

Climate
Huánuco has a mild semi-arid climate (Köppen BSh).

Education

Schools
C.S. Colegio de Ciencias
CNA UNHEVAL
G.U.E. Leoncio Prado
C.S. San Luis Gonzaga

Universities
Universidad Nacional "Hermilio Valdizán"
Universidad Privada "Huánuco"

Notable people
Mariano Ignacio Prado - President and General, born in 1825.
Leoncio Prado - Colonel and hero; fought in Cuba and against the Chilean invasion after The War of the Pacific.
Javier Pulgar Vidal - Famous geographer, born in Panao Province.
 Daniel Alomía Robles - Musical composer and ethnologist born in 1871, famous for El Cóndor Pasa
 Johan Fano- Professional football player

Transportation 
It is served by the Alférez FAP David Figueroa Fernandini Airport. One of the main highways of the country passes by Huanuco, connecting Lima-Callao with Tingo Maria and Pucallpa in the Peruvian Amazonia.

See also 
 Administrative divisions of Peru
 Killa Rumi

Notes

External links

Noticias de Huanuco
Huanuco
Huánuco Súper VIP
Huánuco - Catholic Encyclopedia article

Populated places in the Huánuco Region
Populated places established in 1539
Cities in Peru
1539 establishments in the Spanish Empire
Regional capital cities in Peru